The Falkland Islands general election of 1968 was held on 13–15 March 1968 to elect members to the Legislative Council. Four out of the ten Councillors were elected through universal suffrage, two from Stanley and one each from East Falkland and West Falkland.

Results
Candidates in bold were elected.  Candidates in italic were incumbents.

Stanley constituency

East Falkland constituency

West Falkland constituency

References

1968 elections in South America
General election
1968
Non-partisan elections
March 1968 events in South America
1968 elections in the British Empire